Raphael Isaiah Azulai (born in Hebron 1743 – 9 Shvat, 1826 or possibly 1830) was a rabbi in Ancona until his death. He was the firstborn of Rabbi Chaim Yosef David Azulai. One of his daughters married Abraham Pardo, son of the renowned rabbi David Pardo; and her grandson Moses Pardo was rabbi of Alexandria from 1871 to 1888. He was the author of a number of responsa and decisions, which appeared partly under the title Tiferet Mosheh (The Splendor of Moses), and partly in the Zikron Mosheh of his son Moses (No. 10).

Descendants currently live across the middle east and north Africa.

See also 
 History of the Jews in Ancona

References 

 

 Its bibliography:
Azulai, Shem ha-Gedolim, s.v.;
Joseph Zedner, Cat. Hebr. Books British Museum;
Ḥazan, Ha-Ma'alot li-Shelomoh, 1894;
The Leisure Hour, London, Aug., 1886;
Allg. Zeit. des Judenthums, 1839, p. 60; private sources

Year of birth unknown
1740s births
1826 deaths
18th-century Italian rabbis
18th-century Moroccan Jews
Italian people of Moroccan descent
Rabbis from Ancona
19th-century Italian rabbis